Franz Jellinek was an Austrian footballer who played as a defender and made one appearance for the Austria national team.

Career
Jellinek earned his first and only cap for Austria on 6 May 1928 in a friendly match against Hungary. The away match, which took place in Budapest, finished as a 5–5 draw.

Career statistics

International

References

External links
 Profile by Austrian Football Association

Year of birth missing
Year of death missing
Austrian footballers
Austria international footballers
Association football defenders
FC Admira Wacker Mödling players
Austrian Football Bundesliga players